Buckingham Town Football Club, known as Milton Keynes Robins for the last year of their existence, was a football club based in Buckingham, Buckinghamshire, England. They were established in 1883 and were one of the founding members of the Hellenic League in 1953. After lasting only four seasons they returned to local football, not re-emerging at a higher level until 1974. Having fallen into financial trouble by 2017 and having been evicted from their ground in 2011, they relocated permanently to Milton Keynes in 2019. The club was merged into Milton Keynes Irish a year later.

History
The club was established as Buckingham Town in 1883, playing their first match against Banbury United. They won the Aylesbury & District League in 1902–03 and 1936–37 and the North Bucks League in 1924–25, 1928–29, 1933–34, 1935–36, 1936–37, 1938–39, 1948–49 and 1949–50. They were founder members of the Hellenic League in 1953, but left after only four seasons. They won the Aylesbury & District League again in 1967–68.

Buckingham Town joined Division One of the South Midlands League in 1971, where they played until joining Division Two of the United Counties League in 1974. Their first season in the league saw them finish second, earning promotion to Division One. After finishing as Division One runners-up in 1975–76, the club secured a second successive promotion, moving up to the Premier Division.  They were Premier Division champions and Knockout Cup winners in 1983–84, and the following season they reached the first round of the FA Cup for the first (and to date only) time in their history, losing 2–0 at home to Orient.

In 1985–86 Buckingham Town won the Premier Division again and were promoted to the Midland Division of the Southern League. After being transferred to the Southern Division in 1988, they won the division in 1990–91, but were not promoted as their ground failed to meet the standards required. They were moved back to the Midland Division in 1994, but returned to the Southern Division in 1996. However, after finishing bottom of the division in 1996–97, they were relegated back to the Premier Division of the United Counties League. The 2006–07 season saw them finish bottom of the Premier Division, resulting in relegation to Division One. The club announced that they were folding at the end of the 2017–18 season. However, the decision was later reversed.

The club was renamed Milton Keynes Robins in January 2019. In May 2020 the club merged with Unite MK and Milton Keynes Irish Veterans merged to form Milton Keynes Irish.

League record

Ground
Buckingham Town played at Ford Meadow from 1883 until being evicted at the end of the 2010–11 season. The 3.58 acre site included a football pitch, two stands, a clubhouse, changing rooms and a large hard area. After leaving Ford Meadow, the club played at the Winslow Centre in Winslow for the 2011–12 season, before moving to Manor Fields in the Fenny Stratford area of Milton Keynes.

Honours
Southern League
Southern Division champions 1990–91
United Counties League
Premier Division champions 1983–84, 1985–86
Knockout Cup winners 1983–84
Aylesbury & District League
Champions 1902–03, 1936–37, 1967–68
North Bucks League
Champions 1924–25, 1928–29, 1933–34, 1935–36, 1936–37, 1938–39, 1948–49, 1949–50

Records
Best FA Cup performance: First round, 1984–85
Best FA Trophy performance: First qualifying round, 1994–95, 1995–96, 1996–97
Best FA Vase performance: Quarter-finals, 1990–91, 1992–93
Record transfer fee received: £1,000 from Kettering Town for Terry Stevens
Record transfer fee paid: £7,000 to Wealdstone for Steve Jenkins, 1992

See also
Buckingham Town F.C. players
Buckingham Town F.C. managers

References

 
Defunct football clubs in Buckinghamshire
Sport in Milton Keynes
1883 establishments in England
2020 disestablishments in England
Association football clubs established in 1883
Association football clubs disestablished in 2020
Buckingham
North Bucks & District Football League
Hellenic Football League
South Midlands League
Spartan South Midlands Football League
Southern Football League clubs
United Counties League